Traditional dyes of the Scottish Highlands are the
native vegetable dyes used in Scottish Gaeldom.

The following are the principal dyestuffs with the colours they produce. Several of the tints are very bright, but have now been superseded for convenience of usage by various mineral dyes. The Latin names are given where known and also the Scottish Gaelic names for various ingredients.

Recipes 

Many of the dyes are made from lichens, the useful ones for this purpose being known as crottle.

The process employed is to wash the thread thoroughly in urine long kept ("fual"), rinse and wash in pure water, then put into the boiling pot of dye which is kept boiling hot on the fire. The thread is lifted now and again on the end of a stick, and again plunged in until it is all thoroughly dyed. If blue, the thread is then washed in salt water, but any other colour uses fresh water.

Amateurs may wish to experiment with some of the suggestions, as urine (human or animal) is used in many recipes as a mordant. A number of the recipes used are for more than one colour, and this chart is only a guide.

Claret
 Claret – "corcar" – the cudbear lichen, Lecanora tartarea, scraped off rocks and steeped in urine for three months, then taken out, made into cakes, and hung in bags to dry. When used these cakes are reduced to powder, and the colour fixed with alum.

Black – Dubh

 Black (finest) –
 Common dock root with copperas.
 "Darach" – oak bark and copperas
 (also grey),  "seileastair", iris root
 "Sgìtheach", hawthorn bark with copperas
 Alder bark with copperas
 Blue-black
 Common sloe – Prunus spinosa – "preas nan àirneag"
 Red bearberry – Arbutus uva ursi, "grainnseag"

Blue – Gorm

 Blue
 Blaeberry (Vaccinium myrtillus) with alum or copperas
 Elderberry (Sambucus nigra) with alum
 "Ailleann" elecampane

Brown – Donn

 Brown
 Common yellow wall lichen – Xanthoria parietina
 Dark "crotal" (type of lichen) – Parmelia cetarophilia
 "Duileasg" (dulse), a kind of seaweed.
 Currant with alum
 Dark chestnut-brown
 Roots of "rabhagach", the white waterlily
 Dark brown
 Blaeberry with nut-galls
 Reddish brown - Ruadh
 The dark purple lichen ‘cen cerig cen du' (gun chéire gun dubh – i.e. neither crimson nor black) treated in the same way as the lichen for the claret dye.
 Philamot
 Yellowish "crotal" (type of lichen), the colour of dead leaves – Parmelia saxatilis
Drab or fawn
 Birch bark, Betula pubescens

Green – Uaine

 Green
 Ripe privet berries with salt (listed for crimson too)
 Wild Mignonette (Reseda), reseda luteola, "lus buidhe mòr", with indigo
 "Rùsg conaisg", whin bark
 Cow weed 
 "Lively" green
 Common broom
 Dark green
 Heather, Erica cinerea, "fraoch-bhadain" with alum. The heather must be pulled before flowering and from a dark, shady place.
 Iris leaf ("Duilleag seileisteir")

Magenta

 Magenta
 Dandelion, Taraxacum officinale, "beàrnan-Brìde"

Orange – Orains/Dearg-buidhe

 Orange
 Ragweed  ("Stinking Billy") – Senecio jacobaea, "buaghallan"
 Barberry root –Berberis vulgaris, "barbrag"
 Dark orange
 Bramble –Rubus fruticosus, "preas smeur"

Purple – Corcar/Purpaidh

 Purple
 Euonymus (Spindle tree), with sal-ammoniac
 Sundew – Drosera rotundifolia, "lus na feàrnaich"
 Blaeberry – Vaccinium myrtillus, with alum

Red – Dearg

 Red
 Tormentil – Potentilla tormentilla, "leanartach"
 Rock lichen – Ramalina scopulorum, "crotal"
 White crottle – Lecanora pallescens, "crotal-geal"
Fine red
 Rue – Galium verum, "ladies' bedstraw". A very fine red is obtained from this. Strip the bark off the roots, then boil them in water to extract the remainder of the virtue, then take the roots out and put the bark in, and boil that and the yarn together, adding alum to fix the colour.
 Galium boreale – treated in the same way as gallium virum above.
 Purple-red
 Blaeberry – Vaccinium myrtillus, lus nan dearc, with alum, verdigris and sal-ammoniac
 Crimson
 "Crotal-corcar" – Lecanora tartarea, white and ground with urine. This was once in favour for producing a bright crimson dye.
 Scarlet
 Limestone lichen – Urceolaria calcaria, "Crotal cloich-aoil" – used by the peasantry in limestone districts, such as Shetland.
 Ripe privet berries with salt. (Listed for green too!)

Violet

 Violet
 Wild cress – Nasturtium officinale "biolair"
 Bitter vetchling – Lathyrus linifolius — cairmeal
 Bilberries fixed with alum

Yellow – Buidhe

 Yellow
 Apple-tree, ash and buckthorn
 Poplar and elm
 Bog myrtle, Roid
 Ash roots
 Teazle – Dipsacus fullonum – lùs an fhùcadair/leadan
 Bracken roots – Raineach mhòr
 Cow weed
 Tops and flowers of heather, Erica, fraoch
 Wild mignonette, Reseda luteola, "lus-buidhe mòr", dried, reduced to powder and boiled.
 Leaves and twigs of dwarf birch, beithe-bheag
 Bright yellow
  Sundew – Drosera rotundifolia, "lus na feàrnaich" with ammonia
 Rich Yellow
 St John's Wort, achlasan Chalum cille, fixed with alum
 Dirty yellow
 Peat soot. Obviously this ingredient on its own will not produce yellow
 Rhubarb, (monk's) – Rumex alpinus – lus na purgaid

See also
Flora of Scotland

References 

 (Dath), with additions and corrections. Also, Scottish Gaelic spelling is subject to variations.

External links
Scottish National Heritage site on Lichen dyes
Bibliographic references for Parmelia

Further reading

Fraser, Jean: Traditional Scottish Dyes, Canongate, 1983, 

Natural dyes
Scottish clothing
Cultural history of Scotland
Textile arts of Scotland
Flora of Scotland